The 1876-77 Sheffield Senior Cup was the first edition of the tournament, played to Sheffield rules.  It was the biggest tournament played to the Sheffield code and the equivalent of the FA Cup, which at the time was mostly confined to the south of England.

Background

The Sheffield Football Association was founded in 1867 and took a subscription of 5 shillings from its member clubs in order to entitle them to entry.  Sheffield F.C. did not enter, as the club was concentrating on national matches.

The Sheffield rules in force at the time had four main differences to the Association laws:

players were onside so long as one opponent was between them and the goal-line, whereas the Association offside law demanded three;
if the ball went off the side of the pitch, it was put back into play by a kick-in, rather than a throw-in, in any direction;
if the attacking team put the ball out of play to the side of the goal, the defending team returned the ball from the nearest corner;
if either team put the ball out of play over the bar of the goal, the defending team returned the ball from within 6 yards of their goal.

At the time, neither the Association nor Sheffield codes prescribed the number of players per side, and the size of the teams was a matter for negotiation between the captains or the relevant tournament rules.  By 1876, most matches were 11 per side, and this was the rule in the FA Cup.  For this tournament, the Sheffield FA mandated 12 men per side, as did the Birmingham Senior Cup the same year.

Participating teams

Format

The competition was organized as a straight knockout tournament, with replays to a conclusion.  The captains would toss for choice of venue, the captain who lost the toss could choose the venue for a replay, and second replays were to be at the first captain's choice again.

Results

First round

Replays

Second round

Replay

Third round

The ties in the third round and semi-finals were due to be played at Bramall Lane, but the third round ties were all played according to the captain's toss rule.  Curiously, all three ties went the way of the away side.

Semi-finals

The semi-finals were played at Bramall Lane, one after the other, before a crowd of six or seven thousand.

Final
The final was a thriller, with Heeley taking a three-goal lead by half-time, but Wednesday fighting back to take the game to half-an-hour extra-time.

Notes

References 

Sports competitions in Sheffield
1876–77 in English football